Salem is an extinct town in Benton County, Mississippi, United States.

History
Salem was settled in 1836 and incorporated in May 1837.  At one point, Salem was home to twelve businesses, two hotels, and a female school.

Salem was destroyed by the Union Army during the Civil War, leading many residents to resettle in nearby Ashland.

A post office operated under the name Salem from 1837 to 1909.

Notable people
 Nathan Bedford Forrest, Confederate Army officer; spent his childhood in Salem.
 Joseph W. Matthews, 15th Governor of Mississippi from 1848 to 1850.
 Norris C. Williamson, member of the Louisiana State Senate from 1924 to 1932
 Daniel B. Wright, U.S. Representative for Mississippi's 1st congressional district from 1853 to 1857.

References

Settlements destroyed during the American Civil War
Unincorporated communities in Benton County, Mississippi
Unincorporated communities in Mississippi